The Ulba (Ülbı) is a river of Kazakhstan. It joins the Irtysh at Oskemen.

Rivers of Kazakhstan
Tributaries of the Irtysh